This is a list of heads of state and heads of government of the sovereign countries who are of full or partial Indian origin, other than the heads of state and government of countries of the Indian subcontinent. This list does not include acting, interim, transitional, temporary or representative heads of state and government.

Heads of state and heads of government

See also
List of foreign politicians of Indian origin
Indian diaspora
Overseas Citizenship of India
Girmitiyas
Indian indenture system
Indian Arrival Day
Pravasi Bharatiya Divas
Pravasi Bharatiya Samman
List of presidents of India: the heads of state of India
List of prime ministers of India: the heads of government of India

References

Politicians of Indian descent